Pampa del Infierno is a town in Chaco Province, Argentina. It is the head town of the Almirante Brown Department. The town was founded on December 7, 1927.

Provincial goat festival
In May, Pampa del Infierno hosts the annual goat festival ("Fiesta Provincial del Chivo").

External links

 Pampa del Infierno
 Fiesta del Chivo
 Guia Chaco page

Populated places in Chaco Province
Populated places established in 1927